Lambda Piscis Austrini, Latinized from λ Piscis Austrini, is a solitary star in the southern constellation of Piscis Austrinus. It has a blue-white hue and is visible to the naked eye with an apparent visual magnitude of +5.42. Based upon an annual parallax shift of 6.51 mas as measured from Earth, it is located around 500 light years from the Sun. At that distance, the visual magnitude of the star is diminished by an extinction factor of 0.16 due to interstellar dust.

This is a B-type main sequence star with a stellar classification of B7 V. It has an estimated 3.58 times the mass of the Sun and about 4.2 times the Sun's radius. The star is spinning with a projected rotational velocity of 50 km/s and is 76% of the way through its main sequence lifetime. It is radiating 249 times the solar luminosity from its photosphere at an effective temperature of 12,023 K.

Lambda Piscis Austrini is moving through the Galaxy at a speed of 18.1 km/s relative to the Sun. Its projected Galactic orbit carries it between 23,800 and 29,300 light years from the center of the Galaxy.

Naming

References

B-type main-sequence stars
Piscis Austrini, Lambda
Piscis Austrinus
Durchmusterung objects
Piscis Austrini, 16
210934
109789
8478